Hatim Zaghloul (Egyptian Arabic, born February 7, 1957) Ph.D., M.Sc., B.E.E. is  best known for his inventions, together with his long-time friend, Dr. Michel Fattouche of Wideband Orthogonal Frequency Division Multiplexing (WOFDM), and Multi-code Direct-sequence Spread Spectrum (MCDSSS). WOFDM is the foundation for the IEEE 802.11a/g/n technologies whereas MCDSSS helped increase the data rates of code division multiple access (CDMA) technologies as in the CDMA2000 standard.
Currently, Dr. Zaghloul is the CEO and Chairman of Innovatian Inc., Giza, Egypt, a company specializing in building wireless data networks in unconnected countries through WiFi and blockchain. 
Dr. Zaghloul is also the co-founder and Chairman of Hikmah Capital Ltd. a company specializing in the development, marketing and management of financial technology solutions., Calgary, Alberta, Canada. He co-founded with Michel Fattouche, to commercialize their patented WOFDM technology. He founded and co-founded a number of hi-tech companies such as Cell-Loc Location Technologies Inc., a company he co-founded with Michel Fattouche to commercialize a cellular telephone location determination/tracking technology.

Biography
He was born on February 7, 1957, in the Giza, Egypt. At the age of 22, he received a B.Sc. in Electrical Engineering from Cairo University. He served in the Egyptian Armed Forces during 1980. That year he completed the third year and the mid-term for the fourth year of an applied mathematics degree in Ain Shams University, Cairo, Egypt. He worked for Schlumberger Wireline Services as an oil well logging engineer from 1981 to 1983. He was a Teaching Assistant at the University of Calgary from 1984 to-1989. He obtained his M.Sc. in physics from the University of Calgary in 1985. He was a Statistics instructor at the University of Athabasca from 1988 to 1990. He was a senior researcher at Telus from 1989 to 1993. He obtained a Ph.D. in physics from the University of Calgary in 1994. He held various positions in Wi-LAN Inc. from 1993 to 2008. He was the CEO of Cell-Loc Inc. from 1995 to 1997. Dr. Zaghloul was on the board of directors of many hi-tech companies. He was the CEO of Solutrea from 2006 until 2008.

He is currently the Chairman and CEO of Inovatian Inc., that was incorporated in 2016 in Giza, Egypt, as a research and development company specializing in telecommunications and electromagnetics. Inovatian has since led the development of a 6G standard through the 6G Forum.

Awards
 Received the 2000 Fraser Milner Casgrain Pinnacle Award for his entrepreneurial achievements.
 Dr. Zaghloul was a finalist for the Ernst and Young Entrepreneur of the Year Award for in 1997 and 1998.
 He was presented with the Hall of Fame Award from Broadband Solutions on April 10, 2000, for his contribution to the communications technology industry.
 Recipient of the Calgary Immigrants of Distinction Award Recipients for business in 1998.
 Designated by Canadian Computer Wholesaler Magazine as "Technically Excellent Canadian" in July 1999.
 Named one of 10 Great Canadians by MacLean's Magazine in July 2000.

Wi-LAN Inc.

He collaborated on many patents in wireless communications, signal representation and estimation. Based on his patents in WOFDM (Wide-band Orthogonal Frequency Division Multiplexing) he co-founded Wi-LAN Inc. in 1992.

Other business activities
Based on his collaboration with Dr. Fattouche on Super-Resolution, Dr. Zaghloul also co-founded Cell-Loc Inc. in 1995 (which became Cell-Loc Location Technologies Inc. in 2003), the developer of a family of network-based wireless location products that enable location-sensitive services of people and assets using a small portable device. In 2005, he cofounded with his friend, Dr. Syed Amr Elahamasy, Innovative Products for Life Inc., a technology commercialization company. Their first product was an attachment for commercial blenders that would remove grease from fried foods. This work has led to a patent on the technology. Over the years, Zaghloul joined the boards of many companies: NTG Clarity Inc. from 1997 to 2001, Imaging Dynamics from 2000 to 2001, Powerstar International Inc. (and Solutrea Corp.) from 2007 to 2008. QCC Technologies from 1999 to 2001, IPL Media Inc. for Technology from 2009 to the present. IPL Media was incorporated in 2005 in Alberta, Canada.

Press coverage
He has been mentioned in many online and print articles over the past decades. Dr. Zaghloul was named as one of ten great Canadians by MacLean's magazine in July 2000.

Dr. Zaghloul has been named "Calgarian of the Year" by Business in Calgary magazine in 2000.

Patents
 M. Fattouche and H. Zaghloul, "Method and apparatus for multiple access between transceivers in wireless communications using OFDM spread spectrum," U.S. Patent no. 5,282,222, Jan. 25, 1994.
 H. Zaghloul and M. Fattouche, "Demodulation of a Signal Transmitted over a Fading Channel using Phase Estimation, Method and Apparatus," U.S. Patent no. 5,369,670, Nov. 29, 1994.
 M. Fattouche and H. Zaghloul, "Multicode Direct Sequence Spread Spectrum," U.S. Patent no. 5,555,268, Sept. 10, 1996; Revised 37,802, July 23, 2002.
 M. Fattouche, H. Zaghloul, P. Milligan and D. Snell, "Multicode spread spectrum communications system," U.S. Patent no. 6,204,812,  March 20, 2001.
 M. Fattouche, H. Zaghloul, P. Milligan and D. Snell, "Multicode spread spectrum communications system," U.S. Patent no. 6,192,068, February 20, 2001.
 M. Fattouche, H. Zaghloul, P. Milligan and D. Snell, "Multicode spread spectrum communications system," U.S. Patent no. 6,320,897, November 20, 2001.
 H. Zaghloul and M. Fattouche, "Method and apparatus for the compression, processing and spectral resolution of electromagnetic and acoustic signals," U.S. Patent no. 5,570,305, Oct. 29, 1996.
 M. Fattouche, R. Klukas, A. Borsodi, M. Astridge, H. Zaghloul  and G. Lachapelle, "Wireless location system," U.S. Patent no. 5,890,068, March 30, 1999.
 H. Zaghloul and M. Fattouche, "Method and Apparatus for applying the z-domain Zeros to Speech Compression and Spectral Estimation," U.S. Patent no.5,570,305,  Oct. 29, 1996.
 H. Zaghloul, M. Mali, H. Desouki and S. Elhamamsy "Centrifugal Food Degreaser," U.S. Patent no. 7,866,259 January 11, 2011.

Publications
 H.Zaghloul (1st of four authors), "Comparison of Indoor Propagation Channel Characteristics at Different Frequencies," Electronic Letters, 27 (22), 2077–9, 1991.
 H.Zaghloul (2nd of four authors), "Frequency Response Measurements System," Submitted to IEEE Transactions on Instrumentation and Measurements.
 M.Fattouche and H.Zaghloul, "Estimation of the Phase of Signals Transmitted over Fading Channels," Electronic Letters, 27 (20), 1823–4, 1991.
 H.Zaghloul and O.Barajas, "Force-Free Magnetic Fields," An essay in Essays on Recent Advances in Electromagnetics, A.Lakhtakia, Editor, World Scientific, Singapore, 1991.
 H.Zaghloul  and H.A.Buckmaster, "Transverse Electromagnetic Standing Waves with E || B," An essay in Essays on Recent Advances in Electromagnetics, A.Lakhtakia, Editor, World Scientific, Singapore, 1991.
 H.Zaghloul, "A Vector Potential Approach to Gravitation?" accepted for publication in Speculations in Science and Technology.
 H.Zaghloul, "On Wave-Particle Duality for Elastic Waves," accepted for publications in Speculations in Science and Technology.
 H.Zaghloul (1st of three authors), "Frequency Response and Path Loss Measurements of the Indoor Channel," Electronic Letters, 27 (12), 1021–2, 1991.
 H.Zaghloul (1st of four authors), "A Simple Method for the Evaluation of Microwave Mixer Diodes," IEEE Transactions on Instrumentation and Measurements, IM-39, 928–32, 1990.
 H.Zaghloul and O.Barajas, "Force-Free Magnetic Fields," American Journal of Physics, 58, 857–62, 1990.
 H.Zaghloul, "On the Possibility of Force-Free Magnetic Fields," Physics Letters A., A140, 95–6, 1989.
 H.Zaghloul and H.A.Buckmaster, "Properties of TEM Waves with E|| B," Annales des Physique (Fr.), 15, 21–8, 1990.
 H.Zaghloul and H.A.Buckmaster, "TEM Waves with E || B,"American Journal of Physics, 56, 801-6 (1988).
 H.Zaghloul (1st of three authors), "Comment on Invariants of the Electromagnetic Fields," American Journal of Physics, 56, 1988.
 H.Zaghloul, "Lightlike Fields," a letter in the American Journal of Physics, 55, 970, 1987.
 H.Zaghloul (1st of three authors), "Comment on TEM  Waves with E || B," Physical Review Letters, 58, 423, 1987.
 H.Zaghloul (third of four authors), "9 GHz Permittivity Measurements of High-Loss Liquids Using a Variable-Length Cavity and a Dual-Channel, Double Superhetrodyne Signal Processing System," IEEE Transactions on Microwave Theory and Techniques, MTT-35, 909–16, 1987.
 H.Zaghloul and H.A.Buckmaster, "The Complex Permittivity of Water at 9.356 GHz from 10-40DEGC," Journal of Physics D: Applied Physics, 18, 2109–18, 1985.
 H.Zaghloul, "The Complex Permittivity of Water at 9.356 GHz from 10-40DEGC," "M.Sc. Thesis, Department of physics, The University of Calgary, 1985.
 H.Zaghloul (third of three authors) "Complex Permittivity Instrumentation for High-Loss Liquids at Microwave Frequencies," IEEE Transactions on Microwave Theory and Techniques, MTT-33, 822–24, 1985.
 M. Fattouche and H. Zaghloul, "Data Communications over the Mobile Radio Channel Using IS-54," Wireless Personal Communications, vol. 1, no. 3, pp. 221–228, 1995.
 M. Fattouche, B. Olasz, K. Scott and H. Zaghloul, "Modified Simulation of Urban Radio Propagation," Electronics Letters, vol. 29, no. 21, pp. 1825–1826, October 14, 1993.
 D. Tholl, M. Fattouche, R.J.C. Bultitude, P. Melancon and H. Zaghloul, "A Comparison of Two Radio Propagation Channel Impulse Response Determination Techniques," IEEE Trans. Ant. & Prop., vol. 41, no. 4, pp. 515–517, April 1993.
 H. Zaghloul, M. Fattouche, G. Morrison and D. Tholl,"A Comparison of Propagation Channel Characteristics at 1 GHz and 1.6 GHz," Electronics Letters, vol. 27, no. 22, pp. 2077–2079, October 24, 1991.
 M. Fattouche and H. Zaghloul, "Estimation of the Phase Differential of Signals Transmitted over Fading Channels," Electronics Letters., vol. 27, no. 20, pp. 1823–1824, Sept. 20, 1991.
 H. Zaghloul, G. Morrison, M. Fattouche and D. Tholl,"Frequency Response and Path Loss Measurements of The Indoor Channel," Electronics Letters, vol. 27, no. 12, pp. 1021–1022, June 6, 1991.

Contributions/Chapters in Books
 M. Fattouche and H. Zaghloul, "Error Reduction of DMPSK transmitted over Flat Fading Channels," pp. 159–174 in Wireless Personal Communications, edited by M.J. Feuerstein and T.S. Rappaport, published by Kluwer Academic Publishers, 1992.
 M. Fattouche and H. Zaghloul, "A New Equalization Technique for Wideband OFDM over a Selective Fading Channel," in Advances in Wireless Communications, published by Kluwer Academic Publishers, 1993.
 M. Fattouche and H. Zaghloul, "Error Reduction of coded MPSK transmitted over a Flat Fading Channel," Proceedings of Canadian Workshop on Information Theory, Springer-Verlag, 1994.

Other Community Activities
 Dr. Zaghloul and his family were the main sponsors for the "Mysteries of Egypt" Tutankhamen Exhibition in Calgary Glenbow Museum in 2001.

References

Egyptian scientists
1957 births
Living people
Cairo University alumni
Academic staff of the University of Calgary
University of Calgary alumni
Ain Shams University alumni